Mamu in Iran may refer to:
 Mamu, Fars (مموئ - Mamū’)
 Mamu, Lorestan (مامو - Māmū)